Colias sagartia is a butterfly of the family Pieridae. It is found in the Elburz mountains in northern Iran and the mountains of north-western Iran.

The wingspan is 48–54 mm. Adults are on wing from June to July in one generation per year.

The larvae feed on Acantholimon and Astragalus species.

Gallery

References

Butterflies described in 1869
sagartia
Butterflies of Asia
Taxa named by Julius Lederer